Hugh Cameron Burry (29 October 1930 – 18 June 2013) was a rugby union player from New Zealand. He was also an accomplished cricketer, and was eligible for representing New Zealand in international competition, though he did never did so.

Burry played 41 times for Canterbury between 1955 and 1962, in the back row. He played for the All Blacks on the 1960 tour of South Africa; despite a groin injury he played 11 games, scoring 8 tries, but played in no tests.

Because of the demands of medical studies and practice, Burry did not play for the All Blacks until 1960. He was a general practitioner in New Brighton, Christchurch from 1957 to 1965, then a medical registrar at Christchurch Hospital. Burry then went to London until 1976, working at Guy's Hospital and lecturing at London University. He could not get his views on the dangers of scrums and of potentially life-threatening injuries from poor scrum techniques accepted until he published them in the British Medical Journal. Later he was a member of the IRB's medical advisory committee, and oversaw medical services for the first Rugby World Cup in 1987.

Burry was an associate professor of rheumatology at the Wellington Clinical School until 1987, then was professor of rehabilitation medicine at Melbourne University until he retired in 1991. He retired to Hanmer Springs in North Canterbury, where he conducted research for the ACC, and was a consultant on rheumatology and rehabilitative medicine until 2000. Burry died on 18 June 2013, in Hanmer Springs.

Burry's son Mark is an architect, best known for his role as executive architect and researcher for the Sagrada Família.

References 

1930 births
2013 deaths
New Zealand international rugby union players
New Zealand rugby union players
New Zealand cricketers
New Zealand rheumatologists
New Zealand medical researchers
University of Otago alumni
Rugby union players from Christchurch
People educated at Christ's College, Christchurch
Academic staff of the University of Melbourne
Academic staff of the University of Otago
Rugby union number eights